The Professor of Business at Gresham College, London, gives free educational lectures to the general public. The college was founded for this purpose in 1597, when it appointed seven professors; this has since increased to ten and in addition the college now has visiting professors. The Mercers' School Memorial Professor of Commerce chair was created in 1985; in 2018 it was renamed the Mercers' School Memorial Professor of Business.

The Professor of Business is always appointed by the Mercers' School Memorial Trust, which is administered by the Worshipful Company of Mercers. One of the early 18th-century professors, John Ward, was the author of a book about the professors, published in 1740.

List of Gresham Professors of Business

References

External links
 Gresham College website Texts and video of recent lectures
 Gresham College old website, Internet Archive List of professors

Further reading
  (reissued by Johnson Reprint Corporation, New York, 1967)

Commerce
1985 establishments in England